Kultur is a 1918 American silent film directed by Edward J. Le Sainte starring Gladys Brockwell in the lead role as Countess Griselda Von Arenburg.  No copies of the film are known to exist per the Library of Congress.

Plot
The film tells of a German plot to start the First World War, with the Kaiser's mistress asking her servant to assassinate Archduke Franz Ferdinand and the subsequent cover-up that ensues.

Cast
Gladys Brockwell as Countess Griselda, the Emperor's mistress
Georgia Woodthrope
William Scott as René, the Frenchman
Willard Louis as Baron von Zeller
Charles Clary as Archduke Franz Ferdinand
Nigel de Brulier as Griselda's servant
William Burress 
Alfred Fremont

References

External links
 

1918 films
American black-and-white films
American silent feature films
Silent American drama films
1918 drama films
1910s American films